Punjabipedia is a Punjabi language encyclopedia on created by Punjabi University, Patiala on suggestion of Punjab Government. It is developed on the pattern of Wikipedia meant to promote Punjabi language, literature and culture and to attract peoples active in the field of Punjabi language. It was announced on January 18, 2014 during 30th three-day international Punjabi conference on 'Punjabi Society and Media' held at the University of Science Auditorium, organized by Department of Punjabi Development, Punjabi University, Patiala.

It was formally launched on February 26, 2014 by Jaspal Singh vice-chancellor of Punjabi University, Patiala. Contradictory to Wikipedia, all entries will be reviewed, controlled and monitored by the university staffs not by the public as in case of Wikipedia. It is said that Punjabipedia includes 72,614 words in comparison to 8,200 words of Punjabi language Wikipedia. It is described as a part of "Mission Punjabi 2020" which aims to promote Punjabi language and to place it among top languages of World.

Overview
Punjabipedia is based on Wikipedia was created by Punjabi University which aims to promote Punjabi language worldwide and make it one of the popular languages of world as a part of "Mission Punjabi 2020". On February 26, 2014 Devinder Singh, director, planning and monitoring, Punjabi University and coordinator of the Punjabipedia said that, punjabipedia will be available in Gurmukhi script and will be more reliable and authentic in comparison to Wikipedia as it'd be controlled and monitored by university staffs despite being based on Wikipedia which allows anyone to access, edit and modify content available across all languages Wikipedia. It was formally launched on February 26, 2014 by Jaspal Singh, vice-chancellor of the Punjabi University.

Punjabipedia includes "Encyclopaedia of Sikhism", a four-volume publication comprising nearly 3,500 entries on various aspects of Sikh history, philosophy and customs for the 6–14 years age group, social, religious movements, art, architecture, shrines, Punjabi grammar, Punjabi conceptual dictionary and linguistic encyclopedia. It also includes Punjab state's history, culture, literature, traditions and other information in Punjabi. Devinder Singh, coordinator of Punjabipedia, on the launch ceremony said that, Punjabi language encyclopaedia 'Mahan Kosh' compiled by Kahn Singh Nabha will be added to the content and database will be enlarged to cover topics relating to not only Punjabi language, art and culture but other subjects as well.

On February 21, 2014 (Mother-tongue day), a Punjabi language awareness march was organized by the Department of Punjabi language of Punjabi University and a call was by made vice-chancellor of the University, Jaspal Singh to make Punjabi language, a language of family, economy, government and of the world.

Parkash Singh Badal, Chief minister of Punjab appreciated the Punjabi University effort to promote Punjab state and Punjabi language.

References

Punjabi-language encyclopedias
Indian online encyclopedias
21st-century encyclopedias
21st-century Indian books